was the tenth Shikken (1301–1311) of the Kamakura shogunate.

References 

1275 births
1311 deaths
Hōjō clan
People of Kamakura-period Japan